De Omweg  is a 2000 Dutch film directed by Frouke Fokkema.

Cast

External links 
 

Dutch drama films
2000 films
2000s Dutch-language films